The Kiev pogrom of October 18-October 20 (October 31-November 2, 1905, N.S.) came as a result of the collapse of the city hall meeting of October 18, 1905 in Kiev in the Russian Empire. Consequently, a mob was drawn into the streets. Among the perpetrators were monarchists, reactionaries, anti-Semites, and common criminals, proclaiming that "all Russia's troubles stemmed from the machinations of the Jews and socialists." The pogrom resulted in a massacre of approximately 100 Jews.

History 
According to William C. Fuller,

The events building up to the Kiev pogrom included a country-wide wave of Jewish pogroms in a number of towns in southern Russian Empire. According to the Jewish Encyclopedia, "anti-Jewish riots (Pogromy) broke out in Elizabethgrad (April 27, 28), Kiev (May 8–11), Shpola (May 9), Ananiv (May 9), Wasilkov (May 10), Konotop (May 10), and during the following six months, in one hundred and sixty other places of southern Russia...It was clear that the riots were premeditated.  To give but one example—a week before the pogrom of Kiev broke out, Von Hubbenet, chief of police of Kiev, warned some of his Jewish friends of the coming riots."

In the opinion of "a Russian from Kiev", published in Prince Vladimir Meshchersky's journal, Grazhdanin (The Citizen), as quoted by Vladimir Lenin, 

Historian Shlomo Lambroza, not trusting the police sources, used data from opposition materials and counted 3,103 murdered Jews for the entire country of Russia during the 1905-1906 wave of pogroms.

See also
Kiev pogroms (1919)
Kiev pogrom (1881)
Kishinev pogrom
 Shuliavka Republic

Notes

References
Early Twentieth Century Timelines: Russia in Chaos 
William C. Fuller, The Foe Within: Fantasies of Treason and the End of Imperial Russia, 2006  
Michael F. Hamm, Kiev: A Portrait, 1800-1917, rev. ed. (Princeton, 1995), p. 191.
S.N. Dubnow, History of the Jews in Russia and Poland from the Earliest Times Until the Present Day, trans. I. Friedlander, vol.2 (Philadelphia, 1920; repr., New York, 1972), p. 128.
Herman Rosenthal Jewish Encyclopedia, volume I page 347 column 1 article "Alexander III., Alexandrovich 

Anti-Jewish pogroms in the Russian Empire
Massacres in Ukraine
1900s in Kyiv
Antisemitism in Ukraine
Mass murder in 1905
Jews and Judaism in Kyiv
Jewish Ukrainian history
Kiev Governorate
1905 in Ukraine
1905 in the Russian Empire
October 1905 events
November 1905 events
1905 in Judaism
1905 murders in the Russian Empire